Andrews Liver Salts  is a laxative and antacid for mild stomach complaints.  It is sold as a powder which is added to water and mixed, creating effervescence, before being swallowed.   The powder contains sugar; an antacid, sodium bicarbonate (22.6% w/w); citric acid (to provide effervescence) (19.5% w/w); and a laxative, magnesium sulphate (17.4% w/w).  The product is similar to Eno's salts and Kruschen salts, and a mild form of Epsom salts.  The term "liver salts" or "health salts" is typically used for a laxative.  

Andrews Liver Salts was first sold from 1894, by William Henry Scott and William Murdoch Turner.  Their business in the north-east of England originally imported margarine in the 1870s and 1880s.  Their offices were in Gallowgate, Newcastle upon Tyne, and the product was named after St Andrew's church nearby. The trademark "Andrews Liver Salt" was registered in 1909.  From the 1930s, promotional materials recommended taking the salts for "inner cleanliness".

In 1960, Scott and Turner's company merged with Charles Phillips, manufacturers of milk of magnesia, to become Phillips, Scott & Turner. The merged company was acquired by Frederick Stearns & Co, a subsidiary of Sterling Drug, in 1923, and acquired by SmithKline Beecham in 1995.  Andrews and Eno's salts are both now made by GlaxoSmithKline.

Cultural references
Andrews Liver Salts were widely advertised and, as a relatively rich company, could often afford large billboards. As such, the brand appears incidentally within many British movies, such as the chase scene in the film, Brighton Rock.

The protagonist in Albert Camus's novel The Stranger clips out an advertisement for Kruschen Salts.

References

External links
 Famous formulations--Andrews Liver Salt, Drug Discovery Today, Volume 9, Issue 8, 15 April 2004, Pages 346–347
 Fritz Spiegl's Sick Notes, Fritz Spiegl, CRC Press, 1996, p.10
 Original Andrews Salts, NHS choices
 UK patient information leaflet, electronic Medicines Compendium
 Newcastle Chemistry Trail
 Scott and Turner Ltd, The National Archives

Antacids
Laxatives
GSK plc brands